Gormanston railway station was a short lived railway station in Gormanston, Tasmania at the highest location on the North Mount Lyell Railway. It was situated on the lower northern slopes of Mount Owen in the Linda Valley, just east of the Iron Blow.

Despite its short lifespan, it was considered an important point to have been reached by the railway.  
The spur to the Gormanston station from Linda was the shortest lived railway operating railway line in Tasmanian railway history, apart from mining and timber tramways that would have been changed regularly in the Zeehan area for instance.

Notes

North Mount Lyell Railway
Railway stations in Western Tasmania